John Francis Harter (September 1, 1897 – December 20, 1947) was a Republican member of the United States House of Representatives from New York.

Harter was born in Perry, New York. He attended the United States Army Officers' Training Camp at Camp Lee, Virginia during World War I.

He received a law degree from the University at Buffalo Law School in 1919 and practiced in Buffalo.

Harter was elected to the United States House of Representatives in 1938 and served in the 67th Congress, January 3, 1939 to January 3, 1941. He ran unsuccessfully for reelection in 1940 against Alfred F. Beiter. He died in Eggertsville, New York on December 20, 1947, and was buried at Forest Lawn Cemetery in Buffalo.

Family
Harter was married to Lillian Unholz Harter. They were the parents of Charles F. Harter and Geraldine R. Harter.

Sources

1897 births
1947 deaths
University at Buffalo alumni
New York (state) lawyers
People from Perry, New York
Republican Party members of the United States House of Representatives from New York (state)
People from Amherst, New York
Burials at Forest Lawn Cemetery (Buffalo)
20th-century American politicians
20th-century American lawyers